Michl Lang (16 January 1899 – 21 December 1979) was a German stage and film actor

Selected filmography
 The Unsuspecting Angel (1936)
 Geheimakte W.B.1 (1942)
 A Heart Beats for You (1949)
 King for One Night (1950)
 Fanfares of Love (1951)
 The Cloister of Martins (1951)
 That Can Happen to Anyone (1952)
 Illusion in a Minor Key (1952)
 Fireworks (1954)
 A Woman of Today (1954)
 The Forest House in Tyrol (1955)
 San Salvatore (1956)
 Two Bavarians in St. Pauli (1956)
 Where the Ancient Forests Rustle (1956)
 Salzburg Stories (1957)
 Wir Wunderkinder (1958)
 I Was All His (1958)
 The Green Devils of Monte Cassino (1958)
 Paprika (1959)
 Storm in a Water Glass (1960)
 Isola Bella (1961)
 Aunt Frieda (1965)
 The Sinful Village (1966)
 Onkel Filser – Allerneueste Lausbubengeschichten (1966)

References

Bibliography 
 Goble, Alan. The Complete Index to Literary Sources in Film. Walter de Gruyter, 1999.

External links 
 

1899 births
1979 deaths
German male film actors
German male stage actors